Absar Alam is a Pakistani senior journalist. He also served as the 5th Chairman of Pakistan Electronic Media Regulatory Authority (PEMRA).

He was appointed chairman of PEMRA in October 2015, and served until his removal by the courts in December 2017.

In April 2020, Absar Alam was shot while walking in a park near his home allegedly by someone who did not like him criticizing the Pakistani military. He was hospitalized to treat his injuries and successfully recovered from his injuries.

References

Pakistani journalists
Nieman Fellows
Chairpersons of Pakistan Electronic Media Regulatory Authority
Living people
Year of birth missing (living people)